Balapur is a suburb in Ranga Reddy district of the Indian state of Telangana. It is located in Balapur mandal of Kandukur revenue division. Balapur is one of the biggest refugee settlements in India, especially Rohingyas.

Culture 
The place is known for the auction of Laddu prasadam during Vinayaka Chavithi. The annual procession of Vinayaka Chaviti, starts from Balapur in old city.

References 

Neighbourhoods in Hyderabad, India
Cities and towns in Ranga Reddy district